Puerto Rico Highway 136 (PR-136) is a short road in Guayanilla, Puerto Rico.

Route description
This road connects from PR-2 and PR-132 with PR-127 near downtown Guayanilla. There are long-term plans to expand the PR-136 to Punta Verraco, in the coast of the municipality, which has not yet materialized because it is a protected natural area.

Major intersections

See also

 List of highways numbered 136

References

External links
 

136
Guayanilla, Puerto Rico